Maksim Sergeyevich Samoylov (born 25 May 1981) is a former Russian professional football player.

Club career
He made his Russian Football National League debut for FC Gazovik-Gazprom Izhevsk on 17 August 2000 in a game against FC Metallurg Krasnoyarsk.

External links

1981 births
Living people
Russian footballers
Association football midfielders
FC Khimik Dzerzhinsk players
FC Izhevsk players
FC Zenit-Izhevsk players
FC Volga Ulyanovsk players